Malta selected their Junior Eurovision Song Contest 2015 artist through a national selection on 11 July 2015, while their song was selected internally. The twenty acts competing to represent Malta were released on 26 June 2015. They performed covers or non-Eurovision candidate songs during the national final, and the winner's Junior Eurovision song was revealed at a later date. Destiny Chukunyere represented Malta in the Junior Eurovision Song Contest 2015 in Sofia, Bulgaria with the song, Not My Soul. Malta won the competition with a record of 185 points, breaking the previous record held by Spain in the 2004 contest.

National final
Each of the 20 participants sang a song of their own choice. After all of them had performed, the jury and televoting cast their votes - each juror had a 25% weighting in the final result (so 75% overall), with the televoting also having a 25% share. The contestants were ranked from 1-20, with 1 being the best. Destiny Chukunyere was announced as the winner of the national final.

At Junior Eurovision
At the running order draw which took place on 15 November 2015, Malta were drawn to perform fifteenth on 21 November 2015, following  and preceding .

Voting

Detailed voting results
The following members comprised the Maltese jury:
 Amber Bondin
 Georgina Abela
 Christabelle Borg
 Dorian Cassar
 Deborah Cassar

Notes

References

Junior Eurovision Song Contest
Malta
2015